Alex or Alexander Row(e) may refer to:

Alex Rowe (rugby league) (born 1985), English rugby league player
Alexander Rowe (runner) (born 1992), Australian athlete
Alex Rowe (soldier) (born 1966), British-born French Foreign Legionnaire and Légion d'honneur holder
Alex Row (Last Exile), a character from the Japanese animated television series Last Exile
Alexander Rou, film director known in English as Alexander Rowe